
Gmina Krypno is a rural gmina (administrative district) in Mońki County, Podlaskie Voivodeship, in north-eastern Poland.

Villages
Gmina Krypno contains the villages and settlements of Bajki-Zalesie, Białobrzeskie, Dębina, Długołęka, Góra, Kruszyn, Krypno, Krypno Wielkie, Kulesze-Chobotki, Morusy, Peńskie, Rekle, Ruda, Zastocze and Zygmunty.

Neighbouring gminas
Gmina Krypno is bordered by the gminas of Dobrzyniewo Duże, Knyszyn, Mońki, Trzcianne and Tykocin.

References
Polish official population figures 2006

Krypno
Mońki County